This list of comedy and humor awards provides an index to articles on notable awards for comedy and humor, including writing and performance. The list is organized by the country of the sponsoring organization, although a few of the awards are not restricted to one country.

See also

 Lists of awards

References

 
Lists of awards